Half Naked & Almost Famous is the major record label debut EP by American rapper Machine Gun Kelly. It was released on March 20, 2012, under Bad Boy and Interscope Records. The album's title comes from the title track, which was featured on his fourth mixtape, Rage Pack (2011).

Reception

Commercial performance
In the United States, the EP debuted at number 46 on the Billboard 200, with first-week sales of 8,500 copies. As of August 2012, the EP has sold 36,500 copies in the United States.

Track listing 

Sample credits
 "See My Tears" contains a sample of "Rain" as performed by  Armin van Buuren and Cathy Burton.
 "Half Naked & Almost Famous" contains a sample of "Young Blood" as performed by The Naked and Famous.
"Warning Shot" contains elements of "Electric Bloom", written by Jack Bevan, Edwin Congreave, Walter Gervers, Yannis Philippakis and Jimmy Smith, performed by Foals.

Charts

References 

2012 debut EPs
Machine Gun Kelly (musician) albums
Interscope Records EPs
Bad Boy Records EPs
Albums produced by J. R. Rotem
Albums produced by J.U.S.T.I.C.E. League